Rank comparison chart of all navies of European states.
Some European countries do not have naval forces, either because they are landlocked Austria, Belarus, the Czech Republic, Moldova, Luxembourg, Bosnia & Herzegovina, Kosovo, Slovakia, San Marino and the Vatican (enclaves with Italy), or naval duties provided by another state such as Monaco (provided by France),  .

Other ranks
The rank insignia of non-commissioned officers and enlisted personnel.

See also 
 Military rank
 Comparative navy enlisted ranks of the Americas
 Comparative navy enlisted ranks of Asia
 Ranks and insignia of NATO navies enlisted

Notes

References 

Military comparisons